Steve Cunningham is President of the Connacht branch of the Irish Rugby Football Union.

Cunningham's rugby career began in UCG where he won three senior cups and three senior leagues. After college was completed, he joined Galway Corinthians and continued to turn out for Connacht. He was involved in some ground-breaking projects around the world, including the development of Thomond Park and Galway Sportsground. He has also played rugby in Zambia, South Africa and Malawi and gained international caps in both Zambia and Malawi.

He then returned to Ireland claimed a senior league and cup double with Corinthians and began his coaching career with the underage Corinthians, where he managed the development of the game in Connacht, eventually graduated to Director of Rugby and eventually President of the club in 1995.

References

Irish rugby union administrators
Irish rugby union coaches
Alumni of the University of Galway
Connacht Rugby non-playing staff
Connacht Rugby players
Irish rugby union players
University of Galway RFC players
Rugby union players from County Galway